Oreodera granulipennis is a species of beetle in the family Cerambycidae. It was described by Zajciw in 1963.

References

Oreodera
Beetles described in 1963